Sir Charles Morrison, 1st Baronet  (18 April 1587 – 20 August 1628) (also Moryson) of Cashiobury in Watford, Hertfordshire, was an English politician who sat in the House of Commons at various times between 1621 and 1628.

Origins
Morrison was the only son and heir of Sir Charles Morrison (d. 1599), MP, of Cashiobury, by his wife Dorothea Clark, daughter of Nicholas Clark.

Career
He succeeded to the estate of Cashiobury on the death of his father on 31 March 1599. He was made Knight of the Bath (KB) in 1603 at the English coronation of King James I and was created a baronet on 29 June 1611.
 
In 1621 Morrison was elected Member of Parliament for Hertfordshire and was re-elected in 1624. He was elected MP for St Albans in 1625 and 1626. In 1628 he was elected MP for Hertford and sat until his death. Prior to his first appearance in Parliament in May 1621, Morrison was reportedly assaulted on the Parliament stairs by the MP for Dunwich, Clement Cooke. After an enquiry, Cooke was imprisoned in the Tower of London for the attack.

Marriage and progeny
On 4 December 1606 at Low Leyton, Essex, Morrison married Mary Hicks, daughter of Baptist Hicks, 1st Viscount Campden. She survived him and remarried (as his second wife) to Sir John Cooper, 1st Baronet of Rockbourne, Hampshire. By his wife he had two sons who died in infancy and a surviving daughter:

Elizabeth Morrison, baptised 1610/11, wife of Arthur Capell, 1st Baron Capell of Hadham and mother of Arthur Capell, 1st Earl of Essex (1631–1683).

Death
Morrison died in 1628 at the age of 41 and was buried in the mortuary chapel of the Morrison and Essex families in St. Mary's Parish Church, Watford. His large, elaborate monument was executed by Nicholas Stone, a celebrated sculptor of the day. It  sits opposite the tomb of his father, who died in 1599 and is designed in a similar style. The monument features reclining effigies of Sir Charles and his wife Mary sculpted in marble. Sir Charles is depicted wearing armour, resting on his elbow, with a scroll under his hand, while his wife is represented reclining on a cushion, wearing a richly embroidered dress. Below them are the kneeling figures of a youth, a boy and a young lady kneeling.

Succession
Sir Charles left no surviving sons and thus the Morrison baronetcy became extinct on his death. The Cashiobury estate was inherited by his only daughter and sole heiress, Elizabeth Morrison, wife of Arthur Capell, 1st Baron Capell of Hadham. The estate thus passed into the Capell family, and was the seat of her eldest son Arthur Capell, 1st Earl of Essex (1631–1683).

References

 

1587 births
1628 deaths
Burials in Hertfordshire
People from Watford
People from St Albans
Members of the Parliament of England for Hertfordshire
English MPs 1621–1622
English MPs 1624–1625
English MPs 1625
English MPs 1626
English MPs 1628–1629
Knights of the Bath
Baronets in the Baronetage of England
Charles